Witnica railway station is a railway station serving the town of Witnica, in the Lubusz Voivodeship, Poland. The station is located on the Tczew–Kostrzyn railway. The train services are operated by Przewozy Regionalne and Arriva.

Train services
The station is served by the following service(s):

Intercity services (TLK) Gdynia Główna — Kostrzyn 
Regional services (R) Kostrzyn - Gorzow Wielkopolski - Krzyz (- Poznan)

References

 This article is based upon a translation of the Polish language version as of November 2016.

Railway stations in Poland opened in 1857
Railway stations in Lubusz Voivodeship
1857 establishments in Prussia